Samuel Barron may refer to:

Samuel Barron (1765–1810), United States Navy officer during the Quasi and First Barbary Wars and brother of James Barron
Samuel Barron (1809–1888), United States and later Confederate Navy officer during the American Civil War